Deivid Tuesta is a Peruvian street skateboarder. He participated at the 2022 South American Games in the roller sports competition, being awarded the gold medal in the men's street event. He was the first person to win a gold medal for Peru at the 2022 South American Games.

References 

Living people
Place of birth missing (living people)
Year of birth missing (living people)
Peruvian skateboarders
Competitors at the 2022 South American Games
South American Games medalists in roller sports
South American Games gold medalists for Peru
21st-century Peruvian people